12th Infantry Division, the largest Pakistani Army infantry division, is currently based in Murree, Punjab close to Azad Kashmir. The Chinar Division's headquarters are located in the Murree Hills Cantonment. The brigades of 12th Division are deployed all across Azad Jammu Kashmir and the Line of Control. With 6 Infantry Brigades, 1 Divisional Artillery brigade and a number of supporting units of Air Defence, Supply, Engineering, Signals and Remount & Veterinary Corps under its command, 12th Infantry division is the largest division of Pakistan Army.

History 
The division was formed in 1948, from troops allocated to Pakistan from the old British Indian Army.  It was the first division sized formation to be created by the Pakistan Army (the three prior ones, 7th (Golden Arrow), 8th and 10th infantry divisions predated Pakistan).

1948 Kashmir War 
The division went into combat against the Indian army in Kashmir. A notable action was the recapturing of Skardu from the Indian forces, accomplished with help from tribesmen from the tribal areas.

1965 Indo-Pakistani War 
In between the wars the division was active on the ceasefire line, where fighting broke out on several occasions. In 1965 the division undertook Operation Grand Slam, whereby under the command of  7th Infantry Division, it attacked and captured Chamb, and then moved on and captured territory beyond the river Tawi, ending up in a position 6 km ahead of Jammu. Although its performance was greatly lauded at the time, its commander Maj-Gen Akhtar Hussain Malik was privately criticised by General Ayub Khan, for abandoning several posts in Kashmir which were then taken by the Indian forces, and for losing the strategically vital Hajir Pir Pass (this would not be retaken until after the ceasefire).

1971 Bangladeshi War 
Six years later, the division went into action again, this time in Poonch-Ranjouri sector. Despite being outnumbered by Indian forces, the formation managed to advance nearly 50 km, all the way to Ranjouri. Unfortunately dogged Indian resistance meant that it was unable to capture Poonch itself. During the war, it was commanded by Maj-Gen Mohammad Akbar Khan.

Recent history 
Since 1971, the formation had been deployed on the Line of Control, dividing the Indian and Pakistani-administered Kashmir, where sporadic fights break out with Indian forces, and occasionally full-fledged actions develop. In 1991, the division defeated an Indian incursion into the Neelum Valley.

List of GOCs (Commanders) 

 Lieutenant-General (Lt. Gen.) Attiqur Rahman
 Lt. Gen. Akhtar Hussain Malik GOC during the 1965 Indo-Pakistani War
 Major General (Maj Gen) Sherin Khan 1966-1970
 Gen. Akhtar Abdur Rahman 1971-74
 Major General Mohammad Akbar 
 Lieutenant-General|Lt. Gen. Zulfiqar Akhtar Naaz, HI(M), S(BT) Jan 1984 - May 1988
 Maj. Mehtab khan (Baloch Regt) (Defence Sectary Azad Kashmir)
 Maj. Gen. Zia ul Haq
 Lt. Gen. Ghulam Muhammad Malik 1990-1992
 Lt. Gen.  Tariq Parvez 1992-1995 
 Lt. Gen. Shahid Aziz, HI(M) 1996-1999
 Gen. Ashfaq Parvez Kayani, NI(M), HI(M) 1999-2001
 Lt. Gen. Waseem Ahmad Ashraf, HI(M) 2001-2003
 Lt. Gen. Khalid Nawaz Khan, HI(M) 2003-2006
 Lt.Gen. Zaheer-ul-Islam, HI(M) 2006-2008
 Lt.Gen. Maqsood Ahmad, HI(M) September 2008 - April 2010
 Maj. Gen. Sohail Ahmad Khan, HI(M) April 2010 - October 2011
 Maj. Gen. Syed Najam ul Hassan Shah, HI(M) October 2011 - July 2013
 Maj. Gen. Faheem ul Aziz July 2013 - March 2015
Maj. Gen. Muhammad Kaleem Asif, HI(M) February 2015 – January 2017
 Lt Gen Azhar Abbas, HI(M) January 2017 - May 2018
Maj.Gen.Amer Ahsan Nawaz,HI(M)
May 2018 - December 2020

References 
 Global Security Website.
 Pakistan Army; A History, by Brian Cloughly.

Divisions of the Pakistan Army
Military units and formations established in 1948
Murree